expr is a command line utility on Unix and Unix-like operating systems which evaluates an expression and outputs the corresponding value.  It first appeared in Unix v7. The command is available as a separate package for Microsoft Windows as part of the UnxUtils collection of native Win32 ports of common GNU Unix-like utilities. The  command has also been ported to the IBM i operating system.

Overview
expr evaluates integer or string expressions, including pattern matching regular expressions. Each symbol (operator, value, etc.) in the expression must be given as a separate parameter. Most of the challenge posed in writing expressions is preventing the invoking command line shell from acting on characters intended for expr to process.

Syntax
Syntax: 

The operators available
 for integers:  addition, subtraction, multiplication, division and modulus
 for strings:  match a regular expression; in some versions: find a set of characters in a string ("index"), find substring ("substr"), length of string ("length")
 for either:  comparison (equal, not equal, less than, etc.)

Example
The following is a (non-POSIX-compliant) example involving boolean expressions:
 expr length  "abcdef"  "<"  5  "|"  15  -  4  ">"  8
This example outputs "1".  This is because length "abcdef"  is 6, which is not less than 5 (so the left side of the | returns zero).  But 15 minus 4 is 11 and is greater than 8, so the right side is true, which makes the or true, so 1 is the result. The program exit status is zero for this example.

For pure arithmetic, it is often more convenient to use bc.  For example:
 echo "3 * 4 + 14 / 2" | bc
since it accepts the expression as a single argument.

For portable shell programming, use of the "index", "length", "match" and "substr" commands must be avoided; string matching remains possible but it must use the "string : regexp" syntax.

See also
List of Unix commands

References

External links

expr invocation in GNU coreutils manual

GNU Project software
Unix programming tools
Standard Unix programs
Unix SUS2008 utilities
IBM i Qshell commands